Narva was a  cargo ship that was built in 1943 as Aletta Noot by Gävle Varvs & Verkstads Nya AB, Gävle, Sweden for German owners. She was seized by the Allies at Flensburg, Germany in May 1945, passed to the Ministry of War Transport (MoWT) and renamed Empire Confederation. In 1946, she was sold into merchant service and renamed Narva. On 22 December 1957, she foundered whilst going to the aid of another ship in distress.

Description
The ship was built in 1943 by Gävle Varvs & Verkstads Nya AB, Gävle.

She had a GRT of 1,991 and a NRT of 1,076.

The engine was built by Christensen & Meyer, Hamburg.

History
Aletta Noot was built for Franz Haniel & Cie GmbH. Her port of registry was Duisburg.

In May 1945, Aletta Noot was seized by the Allies at Rendsburg, Germany. She was passed to the MoWT and renamed Empire Confederation. Her port of registry was changed to London The Code Letters GQFP and United Kingdom Official Number 180728 were allocated. She was operated under the management of Springwell Shipping Co Ltd. In 1946, she was sold to the Scottish Navigation Co Ltd, Glasgow and was renamed Narva. She was operated under the management of Glen & Co, Glasgow.

On 22 December 1957, Narva was on a voyage from Hudiksvall, Sweden to Grangemouth, Scotland with a cargo of woodpulp. A distress call was issued at 02:30 UTC. The TS Leda went to the aid of Narva, which was down by the bow with her propeller high in the air when Leda arrived at 03:30. The crew were at the stern of the ship but none of them jumped into the sea so that Leda could rescue them. Narva ceased to register on the radar screen of Leda at 05:40. A Royal Norwegian Air Force Catalina from Sola was despatched to search for survivors, but only found deck cargo and an upturned lifeboat. Two RAF Coastal Command Shackletons were also despatched from RAF Kinloss, as were two from RAF Ballykelly. A Royal Danish Air Force Catalina also assisted in the search, which was coordinated from RAF Pitreavie.

On 23 July 1958, a question was asked in Parliament by George Lawson, MP as to whether a date had been set for an inquiry into the loss of Narva. The Rt. Hon. Airey Neave, then Minister of Transport and Civil Aviation replied that the inquiry would open in Glasgow on 12 November 1958. The inquiry lasted two days, it determined that the cause of the loss of Narva was through water entering her forward hold through unknown causes, with no fault being found on the part of the crew.

References

External links
 https://www.wrecksite.eu/wreck.aspx?92459

1943 ships
Ships built in Sweden
Steamships of Germany
World War II merchant ships of Germany
Ministry of War Transport ships
Empire ships
Steamships of the United Kingdom
Merchant ships of the United Kingdom
Maritime incidents in 1957
Shipwrecks in the North Sea